A nicking enzyme (or nicking endonuclease) is an enzyme that cuts one strand of a double-stranded DNA at a specific recognition nucleotide sequences known as a restriction site. Such enzymes hydrolyse (cut) only one strand of the DNA duplex, to produce DNA molecules that are “nicked”, rather than cleaved.

They can be used for strand-displacement amplification, Nicking Enzyme Amplification Reaction, exonucleotyic degradation, the creation of small gaps, or nick translation. The latter process has been successfully used to incorporate both radioactively labelled nucleotides and fluorescent nucleotides allowing specific regions on a double stranded DNA to be studied. Over 200 nicking enzymes have been studied, and 13 of these are available commercially and are routinely used for research and in commercial products.

References

External links
New England Biolabs Nicking Enzymes
Fermentas Nicking Enzymes

Molecular biology
Biotechnology
Enzymes